Eois goodmani is a moth in the  family Geometridae. It is found in Costa Rica and Colombia.

References

Moths described in 1913
Eois
Moths of Central America
Moths of South America